Tamannaah is an Indian actress known for her work in Telugu, Tamil and Hindi films. Her first role came in 2005 at the age of 15 with Chand Sa Roshan Chehra in Hindi. The same year she made her Telugu film debut with Sri, and the following year she made her Tamil debut with Kedi. None of these films were profitable ventures. In 2007, Tamannaah achieved her first success in Telugu and Tamil cinema with Happy Days and Kalloori respectively. Her portrayal of a college student in both films received critical acclaim, with the latter earning her a nomination in the Best Actress – Tamil category at the 55th Filmfare Awards South ceremony. Tamannaah's performances in Konchem Ishtam Konchem Kashtam and Kanden Kadhalai (both released in 2009) earned her nominations in the Best Actress – Telugu and Best Actress – Tamil categories at the 57th Filmfare Awards South ceremony. A series of commercially successful films helped her establish a career in Tamil cinema.

In 2010, Tamannaah played the female lead in three Tamil filmsPaiyaa, Sura, and Thillalangadi. Paiyaa was profitable at the box office and earned her a nomination for Best Actress – Tamil at the 58th Filmfare Awards South ceremony. The other two releases underperformed at the box office. She starred in five films in 2011 including 100% Love, which marked her return to Telugu films, and the Tamil film Siruthai, a remake of S. S. Rajamouli Telugu directorial Vikramarkudu (2006). The following year, Tamannaah played the female lead in four Telugu films: Racha, Endukante... Premanta!, Rebel, and Cameraman Gangatho Rambabu. Racha and Cameraman Gangatho Rambabu were commercially successful, and her performance in the former gained her a nomination for Best Actress – Telugu at the 60th Filmfare Awards South ceremony.

Tamannaah made her first appearance in a Hindi film since her debut role with Himmatwala (2013), a remake of the 1983 Hindi film of the same name. She reprised the role played by Sridevi in the original. Himmatwala received a negative reception from the critics, and Tamannaah's performance in the film was criticised. She appeared in four films the following year: Veeram, Humshakals, Aagadu, and Entertainment. Veeram was the only profitable venture among them. The remaining films underperformed at the box office. Tamannaah played a warrior princess in S. S. Rajamouli's Baahubali: The Beginning (2015), the first of two cinematic parts of the bilingual epic film Baahubali. It became one of the highest grossing Indian films of all time earning more than 6 billion (Indian rupees), and gained her a nomination for Best Actress – Telugu at the 63rd Filmfare Awards South ceremony. She later starred in commercially successful films such as Bengal Tiger (2015) and Oopiri (2016); the latter was an official adaptation of Olivier Nakache & Éric Toledano French film The Intouchables (2011). Her performance in dual roles in the horror comedy Devi (2016) earned her a Best Actress – Tamil nomination at the 64th Filmfare Awards South.

Films

Short film

Television

Music videos

Notes

See also 
 List of awards and nominations received by Tamannaah

References

External links 
 

Actress filmographies
Indian filmographies